Live at Roadburn 2008 is the first live album by American black metal band Wolves in the Throne Room. It was released in January 2009 on LP/DVD and later in November 2009 on CD/DVD.

Track listing

Personnel
Wolves in the Throne Room
Nathan Weaver - guitar, vocals
Rick Dahlin - guitar
Will Lindsay - bass
Aaron Weaver - drums

Other
Richard "Robotmonster" Schouten - cover art
Marcel van de Vondervoort - mixing, mastering
José Carlos Santos - photography         (LP version)
Afton Larsen - group photos (CD version)
Carli Davidson - background photo (CD version)
Christophe Szpajdel – logo

Recording
The performance was recorded live at the Roadburn Festival, April 19, 2008 at 013, Tilburg, Netherlands.
Mixed and mastered at Torture Garden Studio, Oss, Netherlands.

Release
Roadburn Records released the album on January 6, 2009. Initially it was only available as an LP/DVD pack (RBR012) in a limited edition of 1000 copies (500 black, 150 gold, 150 yellow, and 200 unknown colours). Later that year, Roadburn released a CD/DVD edition (RBR011).

2009 live albums
Wolves in the Throne Room albums